Nancy Updike is an American public radio producer and writer.  Her work has been featured on radio programs including This American Life and All Things Considered, and has been published in The New York Times Magazine, LA Weekly, The Boston Globe, and Salon.com. She graduated from Amherst College in 1991.

Personal life
Updike is married to Daniel Ephron, an editor at Foreign Policy. They had their first date on July 1, 2003 at Focaccia Bar, an Italian restaurant in Jerusalem.

Career

This American Life

Updike won a Peabody Award in 1996 for her work as a producer on This American Life.  She won the Edward R. Murrow Award for news documentary (2005), and the Scripps-Howard National Journalism Award for the episode of This American Life about private contractors in Iraq titled "I'm From the Private Sector and I'm Here to Help."

Serial
Updike is a producer and co-creator of the true crime podcast Serial. Early in production, the creative team found the story falling flat and Updike is credited with asking, "Where's the hunt?," which transformed Sarah Koenig, the show's narrator, into the show's protagonist.

References

External links
This American Life archive, Updike's segments on the show

Year of birth missing (living people)
Living people
This American Life people
American radio producers
Women radio producers